Lucy Stanton may refer to:

 Lucy Stanton (abolitionist) (1831–1910), African American abolitionist and activist
 Lucy May Stanton (1875–1931), American painter
 Lucy Celesta Stanton, Mormon woman who married and followed William McCary